David Hanna (September 11, 1917 – June 21, 1993) was an American author,  entertainment journalist, and publicist.

He was noted for his  biographies of celebrities such as Ava Gardner (for whom he acted as publicist during the 1950s), Elvis,  John Wayne, and Robert Redford.

Born in Philadelphia but raised in New York, he lived and worked in Hollywood from 1935–1952, after which he returned to New York. In the 1940s he created the CBS radio series Tapestries of Life.   He served as an assistant managing editor at The Hollywood Reporter and a columnist and drama critic for the Los Angeles Daily News.  He was a publicist on such films as Moulin Rouge, War and Peace, and The Man Who Knew Too Much. He also contributed to Film Bulletin,  The New York Times, Cosmopolitan, and London Express.

Hanna also wrote novels and true crime non-fiction. He occasionally used the pseudonyms Gloria Laine and Antony James.

He died of cancer on June 21, 1993 at  St. Luke's-Roosevelt Hospital in New York City, aged 75.

Partial bibliography
 Ava: A Portrait of a Star (1960)
 Robert Redford: The Superstar Nobody Knows (1975)
 The World of Jacqueline Susann (1975)
 Come Up and See Me Sometime: An Uncensored Biography of Mae West (1976) 
 Bogart: A Confidential Biography (1976) 
 Elvis: Lonely Star at the Top (1977) 
 The Life and Times of John Wayne (1979) 
 James Dean: His Tragedy, His Life, His Films (1988) 
 Sinatra: Ol' Blue Eyes Remembered (1990)

References

External links
 Works by David Hanna at Internet Archive

1917 births
1993 deaths
20th-century American journalists
American male journalists
20th-century American writers
American gay writers
20th-century American LGBT people